is  the Head coach of the Tokio Marine Nichido Big Blue in the Japanese B.League.

Head coaching record

|-
| style="text-align:left;"|Tokio Marine Nichido Big Blue
| style="text-align:left;"|2017-18
| 32||5||27|||| style="text-align:center;"|9th in B3 |||-||-||-||
| style="text-align:center;"|-
|-

References

Living people
Japanese basketball coaches
Tokio Marine Nichido Big Blue coaches
Year of birth missing (living people)